Solomon Bush was a Jewish American soldier, born in Philadelphia; son of Matthias Bush, one of the signers of the non-importation agreement (October 25, 1765). He was one of two Lieutenant Colonels in the American Revolutionary Army.

Revolutionary War Service

Battle of Long Island 
Solomon joined the Philadelphia militia as Captain early in 1776 in the Flying Camp of Associators of Pennsylvania. In August, he served in the Battle of Long Island, and while the American army was defeated, he was promoted to Major. On July 5, 1777, he was appointed deputy adjutant-general of the state militia by the supreme council of Pennsylvania.

Battle of Brandywine 
In September, General Howe invaded Pennsylvania, and the militia was called up to defend the city of Philadelphia, and Solomon Bush again saw service. The Battle of Brandywine started on September 11, 1777, and on September 18th, 1777, in a skirmish, Solomon Bush was wounded, a musket ball breaking his thigh bone. His brother, Captain Lewis Bush, was killed in the same battle.

Recovery 
He was taken to the city to recover from his wounds. According to a letter he wrote in November, his doctor had given him seven days to live. As he could not earn his living, being kept, on account of his wound, at his father's home (Chestnut Hill, Philadelphia), the council passed a series of resolutions, October 20, 1779, respecting him, and on October 27 of that year he was promoted to lieutenant-colonel, with pay in accordance with the rank.

Prisoner 
When the British captured the city in December, 1777, he was taken prisoner, but released on parole. It was during this time that he discovered that there was a spy in Washington's headquarters; by Dec. 19, 1777, the information reached Washington

Post-war
Bush was in destitute circumstances in later years, and on November 5, 1785, the council of Pennsylvania, under the presidency of Benjamin Franklin, ordered that a pension be paid him for his meritorious services.

London 
Solomon moved to London and opened a medical practice there. In 1789, he began writing occasional letters to George Washington. On July 20, though he was not the first to do so, he notified Washington of the seizure of an American ship from New York, because the British alleged that numerous seaman aboard were natives of Britain. Though not a diplomat, he undertook to represent America's position and volunteered as an Ambassador to England, but Washington declined to do so.

External links

The Jews in Colonial America by Oscar Reiss on Google Books
Challenge and Change: History of the Jews in America: Early Settlement, by Shelley Kapnek Rosenberg on Google Books

References 

Year of birth missing
Year of death missing
Military personnel from Philadelphia
Pennsylvania militiamen in the American Revolution
People of colonial Pennsylvania
Jewish military personnel